Bobrek  is a village located adjacent to the city of Oświęcim, Lesser Poland Voivodeship, Poland. During the Second World War, Nazi Germany operated a concentration camp at Bobrek.

The concentration camp at Bobrek is mentioned in an episode of the U.S. TV show Law & Order.

Oświęcim
Villages in Oświęcim County